Bittersweet is an album of jazz standards by American musician Mark Isham and Australian vocalist Kate Ceberano. It is Ceberano's first jazz album in twenty years. The album received a nomination for Best Jazz Album at the 2009 ARIA Awards.

Isham and Ceberano performed at the Sundance Film Festival in 2003 and wanted to record an album together. In early 2009, Ceberano flew to Isham's estate outside Los Angeles and recorded the album in his home studio. The pair recorded the album live without overdubs in just three days.

Track listing

Personnel
 Kate Ceberano – vocals
 Mark Isham – trumpet, flugelhorn
 Alan Pasqua – piano
 Tom Warrington – bass
 Peter Erskine – drums

References

Mark Isham albums
Kate Ceberano albums
2009 albums